The 2000 Haryana assembly election resulted in an absolute majority for Indian National Lok Dal. Om Prakash Chautala was elected leader of the party in the assembly and was sworn in as Chief Minister of Haryana on 3 March 2000 for fifth time.

Cabinet Ministers

Minister of State

References

Chautala
Indian National Lok Dal
2000 in Indian politics
2000 establishments in Haryana
2005 disestablishments in India
Cabinets established in 2000
Cabinets disestablished in 2005